Porntip Buranaprasertsuk (born 24 October 1991) is a Thai badminton player. Buranaprasertsuk won her first Superseries title in 2011 India Open on 1 May 2011, becoming the first Thai to win a women's singles title in the Superseries tournament. She competed at the 2010, 2014 Asian Games, also in four consecutive Southeast Asian Games, and was part of the team that won the women's team gold medals in 2011 and 2015 Southeast Asian Games.

Achievement

Southeast Asian Games 
Women's singles

Summer Universiade 
Women's singles

BWF World Junior Championships 
Girls' singles

Asian Junior Championships 
Girls' singles

BWF World Tour (1 runner-up) 
The BWF World Tour, which was announced on 19 March 2017 and implemented in 2018, is a series of elite badminton tournaments sanctioned by the Badminton World Federation (BWF). The BWF World Tours are divided into levels of World Tour Finals, Super 1000, Super 750, Super 500, Super 300 (part of the HSBC World Tour), and the BWF Tour Super 100.

Women's singles

BWF Super Series (1 title, 2 runners-up) 
The BWF Superseries, which was launched on 14 December 2006 and implemented in 2007, is a series of elite badminton tournaments, sanctioned by the Badminton World Federation (BWF). BWF Superseries levels are Superseries and Superseries Premier. A season of Superseries consists of twelve tournaments around the world that have been introduced since 2011. Successful players are invited to the Superseries Finals, which are held at the end of each year.

Women's singles

  BWF Superseries Finals tournament
  BWF Superseries Premier tournament
  BWF Super Series tournament

BWF Grand Prix (1 title, 1 runner-up) 
The BWF Grand Prix had two levels, the BWF Grand Prix and Grand Prix Gold. It was a series of badminton tournaments sanctioned by the Badminton World Federation (BWF) which was held from 2007 to 2017.

Women's singles

  BWF Grand Prix Gold tournament
  BWF Grand Prix tournament

BWF International Challenge/Series (11 titles, 2 runners-up) 
Women's singles

Women's doubles

  BWF International Challenge tournament
  BWF International Series tournament
  BWF Future Series tournament

Performance timeline

Record against selected opponents 
Record against year-end Finals finalists, World Championships semi-finalists, and Olympic quarter-finalists. Last updated as on 17 March 2020.

References

External links 

 
 
 

1991 births
Living people
Porntip Buranaprasertsuk
Porntip Buranaprasertsuk
Badminton players at the 2016 Summer Olympics
Porntip Buranaprasertsuk
Badminton players at the 2010 Asian Games
Badminton players at the 2014 Asian Games
Porntip Buranaprasertsuk
Asian Games medalists in badminton
Medalists at the 2010 Asian Games
Competitors at the 2007 Southeast Asian Games
Competitors at the 2009 Southeast Asian Games
Competitors at the 2011 Southeast Asian Games
Competitors at the 2015 Southeast Asian Games
Porntip Buranaprasertsuk
Porntip Buranaprasertsuk
Southeast Asian Games medalists in badminton
Porntip Buranaprasertsuk
Porntip Buranaprasertsuk
Universiade medalists in badminton
Medalists at the 2013 Summer Universiade
Medalists at the 2015 Summer Universiade
Porntip Buranaprasertsuk